"A Wanderin' Man" is a single by American country music artist Jeannie Seely.  Released in December 1966, it was the first single issued from her second album on Monument, entitled Thanks, Hank!. It was also Seely's third single to be written by husband and songwriter Hank Cochran. "A Wanderin' Man" peaked at #13 on the Billboard Magazine Hot Country Singles chart in early 1967.

Chart performance

References 

1966 singles
Jeannie Seely songs
Songs written by Hank Cochran
Song recordings produced by Fred Foster
1966 songs
Monument Records singles